Manas International School is a private secondary school at Laxmipur Laheriasarai, Darbhanga, Bihar, India. Manas International School is under process for affiliation with the Central Board of Secondary Education, based in Darbhanga.
it is a very good school and the students have a great record of securing high marks in Board Examinations. The alumni of the school include many IITians, Doctors and other posts. The school maintains a high regard in the educational fraternity of Bihar.It will be remain closed till date 8 October 2019 on the event of Durga Puja. It will reopen on 9 October 2019 on previous routine.

References

See also
 Darbhanga

Education in Darbhanga
Educational institutions established in 1999
Schools in Bihar
1999 establishments in Bihar